Janira quadricostata is an extinct species of arthropod. It has been described by Alcide d'Orbigny in 1843.

References

Bibliography 
 

Isopoda
Prehistoric Malacostraca
Fossil taxa described in 1843